Served Like a Girl is a 2017 documentary film about the lives of female United States military veterans as they compete for the crown of Ms. Veteran America, directed by Lysa Heslov. The film was produced by Seth Gordon.

Soundtrack
The film's soundtrack was produced by Linda Perry and Kerry Brown featuring songs from Pat Benatar, Christina Aguilera, Pink, Gwen Stefani. Natasha Bedingfield and Little Mix.

References

External links
 
 
 

2017 films
American documentary films
Documentary films about veterans
2017 documentary films
2010s English-language films
2010s American films